Charles James "Charlie" Liteky (February 14, 1931 – January 20, 2017), formerly known as Angelo Liteky, was an American peace activist who served as a United States Army chaplain in the Vietnam War and was awarded the U.S. military's highest decoration, the Medal of Honor. A Roman Catholic priest, Liteky received the award for braving intense fire to carry 20 wounded soldiers to safety during a 1967 battle. He later left the priesthood, became a social activist, and in 1986 renounced his Medal of Honor.

Military service 
Born on February 14, 1931, in Washington, D.C., Liteky joined the Army from Fort Hamilton, New York. He served in Vietnam as a captain and chaplain in Headquarters and Headquarters Company of the 199th Infantry Brigade. On December 6, 1967, near Phuoc-Lac in South Vietnam's Biên Hòa Province, he was accompanying Company A, 4th Battalion, 12th Infantry Regiment, 199th Light Infantry Brigade, on a search and destroy mission when they came under heavy fire from a numerically superior enemy force. Seeing two wounded men lying  from an enemy machine gun, Liteky shielded them with his body and, once the volume of fire had sufficiently decreased, dragged them to the relative safety of a helicopter landing zone. Although wounded in the neck and foot, he continued to expose himself to hostile fire in order to rescue more of the wounded and administer last rites to the dying. When the landing zone came under fire, he stood in the open and directed the medical evacuation helicopters in and out of the area. After the wounded had been evacuated, he returned to the perimeter to encourage the remaining soldiers until Company A was relieved the next morning. Liteky carried a total of 20 soldiers to safety during the battle. For these actions, he was awarded the Medal of Honor.

Activism 
Liteky left the priesthood in 1975. In 1983, he married a former nun named Judy Balch (1942–2016), who encouraged his involvement in social justice activities, particularly protesting the School of the Americas (now the Western Hemisphere Institute for Security Cooperation) at Fort Benning, Georgia. On July 29, 1986, he renounced his Medal of Honor by placing it in an envelope addressed to then-President Ronald Reagan near the Vietnam Veterans Memorial on the National Mall in Washington, D.C. The decoration is on display at the National Museum of American History. In doing this, he became the only recipient to have renounced the Medal. He wanted to renounce his Medal of Honor before embarking, in September 1986, on the Veterans Fast for Life in protest against the U.S. policies in Central America. He also opposed the United States' invasion of Iraq. He died on January 20, 2017, at the age of 85.

Medal of Honor citation

Liteky's official Medal of Honor citation reads:

See also

 List of Medal of Honor recipients for the Vietnam War
 Roy Bourgeois, activist Catholic priest who also served in Vietnam
 Brian Willson, antiwar activist, former U.S. Air Force officer who served in Vietnam
 Veterans Fast for Life

References
5. https://www.ncronline.org/news/justice/charles-liteky-former-army-chaplain-who-returned-medal-honor-protest-dies

External links
 http://www.charlieliteky.org
 Website for Charlie: Index of Articles, Letters & Sundry Postings
 A Matter of Honor: He gave back his Medal of Honor to risk his freedom in protesting his country's policies from the San Francisco Chronicle
 Picture of Liteky
  Veterans Fast For Life For Peace In Central America Charles Liteky and three other veterans fast on the Capitol steps in protest of U.S. policy in Central America.
 

1931 births
2017 deaths
American anti–Iraq War activists
American anti–Vietnam War activists
American Roman Catholic priests
Central America solidarity activists
Hunger strikers
People from Washington, D.C.
Robert E. Lee High School (Jacksonville) alumni
Liteky, Charles
United States Army chaplains
United States Army Medal of Honor recipients
United States Army officers
United States Army personnel of the Vietnam War
Vietnam War chaplains
Vietnam War recipients of the Medal of Honor